John Phillips (18 September 1949 – 19 October 2017) was a New Zealand cricketer. He played in one first-class match for Canterbury in 1977/78.

See also
 List of Canterbury representative cricketers

References

External links
 

1949 births
2017 deaths
New Zealand cricketers
Canterbury cricketers
Cricketers from Christchurch